Thomas Hawkins (27 June 1766 – 17 January 1850) was a Church of Ireland priest in Ireland during the late eighteenth and early nineteenth centuries.

Hawkins was born in County Kildare and educated at Trinity College, Dublin. He was Rector of Dunkerrin in the Diocese of Kildare, and in 1807 he was appointed a chaplain to The Lord Lieutenant of Ireland. He became Dean of Clonfert in 1812, and held the post until his death.

References

Deans of Clonfert
19th-century Irish Anglican priests
18th-century Irish Anglican priests
Alumni of Trinity College Dublin
1766 births

1850 deaths

People from County Kildare